Sno or SNO may refer to:

People 
 Evander Sno (born 1987), Dutch football coach and former player
 Shaquill Sno (born 1996), Dutch footballer

Other uses 
 "Snö", a song by Laleh
 Sakon Nakhon Airport, Thailand
 Senecionine N-oxygenase, an enzyme
 Serbian National Renewal, a defunct political party in Serbia
 Standard Bank Namibia
 Sudbury Neutrino Observatory
 Symphony Number One, an American chamber orchestra
 Tin(II) oxide (SnO)